Air Changan is a Chinese domestic airline. Its main operating base is Xi'an Xianyang International Airport, serving several cities in Shaanxi Province. Initially an independent carrier, Air Changan merged with Hainan Airlines in 2000 and was later absorbed into that airline. Air Changan resumed service as an independent airline in May 2016, providing flights to four Chinese cities with three Boeing 737-800 aircraft.

History 
In order to develop the local economy and aviation industry, in September 1990, the Shaanxi provincial government and local aircraft manufacturers began planning for a local airline, to operate with three Xian Y-7 aircraft. On 2 March 1992, the provincial government named the airline as Air Changan. On 11 April 1992, Air Changan was formally founded, merging Dapeng Airlines in to the new entity. On 5 January 1993, the first flight of Air Changan operated, from Xi'an to Yulin. Then was transfer to be operated by the provincial government only, after the aircraft manufacturers left the venture due to new regulations coming into effect.

On 30 August 2000, Air Changan was purchased by Hainan Airlines (HNA) and renamed Chang An Airlines. On 1 July 2002, the first Boeing 737-400 was put into operation. In October 2002, Chang An Airlines, Xinhua Airlines and Shanxi Airlines were merged into Hainan Airlines.

In December 2015, HNA Group began talks with the Shaanxi provincial government regarding the restoration of Chang An Airlines as an independent carrier. The airline would return to its original focus of flights within and out of Shaanxi Province. The airline rebranded as its original name and unveiled its own livery. After receiving its air operator certificate in April 2016, Air Changan resumed operations as an independent airline the following month on 9 May. The inaugural flight was from Xi'an to Zhuhai. During the customary water salute upon arrival in Zhuhai, the fire engines accidentally sprayed foam instead. As a result, the aircraft had to undergo a safety check, and the return flight was cancelled.

Corporate affairs
Hainan Airlines holds an 83.3% stake in the airline, up 21.9% following a 1.01 billion yuan share purchase in September 2015.

Destinations

People's Republic of China 

 Beihai, Guangxi - Beihai Fucheng Airport
 Changchun, Jilin - Changchun Longjia International Airport
 Chizhou, Anhui - Chizhou Jiuhuashan Airport
 Dalian, Liaoning - Dalian Zhoushuizi International Airport
 Dunhuang, Gansu - Dunhuang Airport
 Fuzhou, Fujian - Fuzhou Changle International Airport
 Guilin, Guangxi - Guilin Liangjiang International Airport
 Guiyang, Guizhou - Guiyang Longdongbao International Airport
 Haikou, Hainan - Haikou Meilan International Airport
 Hailar District, Inner Mongolia - Hulunbuir Hailar Airport
 Hanzhong, Shaanxi - Hanzhong Chenggu Airport
 Hefei, Anhui - Hefei Xinqiao International Airport
 Huai'an, Jiangsu - Huai'an Lianshui Airport
 Huaihua, Hunan - Huaihua Zhijiang Airport
 Huizhou, Guangdong - Huizhou Pingtan Airport
 Jieyang, Guangdong - Jieyang Chaoshan International Airport
 Jingdezhen, Jiangxi - Jingdezhen Luojia Airport
 Lanzhou, Gansu - Lanzhou Zhongchuan International Airport
 Lianyungang, Jiangsu - Lianyungang Baitabu Airport
 Luoyang, Henan - Luoyang Beijiao Airport
 Mudanjiang, Heilongjiang - Mudanjiang Hailang International Airport
 Nanchang, Jiangxi - Nanchang Changbei International Airport
 Nantong, Jiangsu - Nantong Xingdong Airport
 Ningbo, Zhejiang - Ningbo Lishe International Airport
 Qinhuangdao, Hebei - Qinhuangdao Beidaihe Airport
 Sanya, Hainan - Sanya Phoenix International Airport
 Shenyang, Liaoning - Shenyang Taoxian International Airport
 Shijiazhuang, Hebei - Shijiazhuang Zhengding International Airport
 Taizhou, Zhejiang - Taizhou Luqiao Airport
 Tongliao, Inner Mongolia - Tongliao Airport
 Tongren, Guizhou - Tongren Fenghuang Airport
 Weifang, Shandong - Weifang Airport
 Wenzhou, Zhejiang - Wenzhou Longwan International Airport
 Xi'an, Shaanxi - Xi'an Xianyang International Airport
 Xiamen, Fujian - Xiamen Gaoqi International Airport
 Xining, Qinghai - Xining Caojiabao International Airport
 Yancheng, Jiangsu - Yancheng Nanyang International Airport
 Yantai, Shandong - Yantai Penglai International Airport
 Yichang, Hubei - Yichang Sanxia Airport
 Yinchuan, Ningxia - Yinchuan Hedong International Airport
 Yingkou, Liaoning - Yingkou Lanqi Airport
 Zhuhai, Guangdong - Zhuhai Jinwan Airport

Fleet

Current fleet
As of December 2022, Air Changan operates the following aircraft:

Previously operated
Air Changan previously operated the following aircraft:
 Airbus A319
 Boeing 737-400
 Boeing 737-700
 Bombardier Dash 8 Q400
 Embraer 190
 Fairchild-Dornier 328-300
 Xian MA60
 Xian Y-7

References

External links 

 

Airlines established in 1992
Companies based in Xi'an
HNA Group
Airlines of China
Chinese companies established in 1992